The  was a combat aviation unit of the Imperial Japanese Navy Air Service (IJNAS) during the Pacific Campaign of World War II.

History
The 25th Air Flotilla, mainly consisting of land-based bombers, fighters, and reconnaissance aircraft, reported to the 11th Air Fleet. As originally organized, the flotilla's core units were the 4th Air Group, Tainan Air Group, and Yokohama Air Group. The 4th flew bombers, the Tainan fighters, and the Yokohama reconnaissance aircraft. The flotilla, under the command of Rear Admiral Sadayoshi Yamada, was deployed to Rabaul, New Britain on 29 March 1942. From this location, the unit supported Japanese military operations in the New Guinea and Solomon Islands Campaigns. During these campaigns, the unit was augmented by aircraft from other flotillas (i.e., 2nd Air Group and 3rd Air Group). The operational title for this hybrid organization was the 5th Air Attack Force. The organization took heavy losses in air combat over Guadalcanal.

Organization

Commanding officers

References
Footnotes

Citations

Bibliography

 
 

 
 
 
 
 Monthly "The Maru" series, and "The Maru Special" series,  (Japan)
 "Ships of the World" series,  (Japan)
"Famous Airplanes of the World" series and "Monthly Kōku Fan" series, Bunrindō (Japan)

Units of the Imperial Japanese Navy Air Service
Military units and formations established in 1942
Military units and formations disestablished in 1944
Military units and formations established in 1944
Military units and formations disestablished in 1945